The 2002 Indiana Hoosiers football team represented Indiana University Bloomington during the 2002 NCAA Division I-A football season. They participated as members of the Big Ten Conference. The Hoosiers played their home games at Memorial Stadium in Bloomington, Indiana. The team was coached by Gerry DiNardo in his first year as head coach. The Hoosiers finished the 2002 season with a 3–9 (1–7 Big Ten) record to finish last in the Big Ten.

Schedule

Roster

2003 NFL draftees

References

Indiana
Indiana Hoosiers football seasons
Indiana Hoosiers football